Red kite or Redkite may refer to:
 Red kite (Milvus milvus), a medium-large bird of prey
 Redkite, airborne wide-area motion imagery sensor
 Red Kite Animation, British animation production
 Red Kite (band), Norwegian prog-jazz band
 Redkite (organisation), charity organisation in Australia
 Red Kite (Sarah Cracknell album)